The men's doubles tennis event of the 2011 Pan American Games was held from October 18–22 at the Telcel Tennis Complex in Guadalajara. The defending Pan American Games champion is Eduardo Schwank and Horacio Zeballos of Argentina.

Seeds

Draw

Finals

Top half

Bottom half

References

Men's Singles